East Washington Village is a multiethnic neighborhood in Pasadena, California, straddling the border with Altadena and centered on Washington Boulevard between Hill Avenue and Altadena Drive. Though the western half is in incorporated Pasadena, the eastern half is in unincorporated Altadena.

Landmarks
East Washington Village has heavy commercial development throughout its entire length, and has undergone significant redevelopment in the last decade.
The district's southwestern section is home to many federal-style homes, making it a frequent location for films.

Education
East Washington Village is home to Webster Elementary School, and is served by Eliot Middle School and Pasadena High School.

Transportation
East Washington Village is served by Metro Local lines 256 and 686; and Pasadena Transit routes 31 and 32.

Armenian-American culture in California
Armenian diaspora communities in the United States
Neighborhoods in Pasadena, California
Altadena, California
Communities in the San Gabriel Valley